Philip Maneval (born 1956) is an American composer and arts administrator.

As a composer, Maneval has written more than 35 solo, chamber music and orchestral works which have been played by groups including the Chicago String Quartet and Miami String Quartet, and performed at the Marlboro Music Festival and Kimmel Center for the Performing Arts.
As an administrator, Maneval is the Executive Director of the Philadelphia Chamber Music Society and Manager of the Marlboro Music School and Festival.

Maneval grew up in Leonia, New Jersey. He studied composition at the Oberlin Conservatory of Music and in the graduate school at the University of Pennsylvania.  His teachers included Richard Wernick, George Crumb and George Rochberg. As of 2008, he lives in Swarthmore, Pennsylvania, with his wife and two children.

External links
Philip Maneval's page at Theodore Presser Company

References

1956 births
Living people
American male composers
21st-century American composers
Oberlin Conservatory of Music alumni
People from Leonia, New Jersey
People from Pennsylvania
University of Pennsylvania alumni
21st-century American male musicians